G-protein coupled receptor-associated sorting protein 1 is a protein that in humans is encoded by the GPRASP1 gene.

Interactions 

GPRASP1 (gene) has been shown to interact with Delta Opioid receptor.

References

Further reading